Minabad (also Romanized as Mīnābād; also known as Mayāvar, Menabad, Mīnāābād, Minavar, and Mīnvar) is a village in Minabad Rural District of Anbaran District, Namin County, Ardabil province, Iran. At the 2006 census, its population was 1,311 in 306 households. The following census in 2011 counted 1,177 people in 338 households. The latest census in 2016 showed a population of 1,139 people in 320 households; it was the largest village in its rural district.

References 

Namin County

Towns and villages in Namin County

Populated places in Ardabil Province

Populated places in Namin County